The 2018 Miami Hurricanes football team (variously "Miami", "The U", "UM", "'Canes") represented the University of Miami during the 2018 NCAA Division I FBS football season. The Hurricanes were led by third-year head coach Mark Richt and played their home games at Hard Rock Stadium. They competed as a member of the Coastal Division of the Atlantic Coast Conference (ACC). They finished the season 7–6, 4–4 in ACC play to finish in a 3-way tie for 3rd in the Coastal Division. They were invited to the Pinstripe Bowl where they would lose to Wisconsin.

On December 30, 2018, Richt announced his retirement after 3 seasons at Miami and 18 overall as head coach. That same day, the school named Manny Diaz as their new head coach.

Previous season
The Hurricanes finished the 2017 season 10–3 overall and 7–1 in ACC play to win the Coastal Division for the first time and earn a trip to the ACC Championship Game, where they were defeated by Clemson. They received an invitation to the Orange Bowl where they lost to Wisconsin.

Offseason

Recruiting

Position key

Recruits

The Hurricanes signed a total of 23 recruits.

Preseason

Award watch lists

ACC media poll
The ACC media poll was released on July 24, 2018.

Schedule

Roster

Game summaries

vs LSU

Savannah State

at Toledo

FIU

North Carolina

Florida State

at Virginia

at Boston College

Duke

at Georgia Tech

at Virginia Tech

Pittsburgh

vs. Wisconsin (Pinstripe Bowl)

Rankings

2019 NFL Draft

References

Miami
Miami Hurricanes football seasons
Miami Hurricanes football